Black Bog is a raised bog in County Tyrone, Northern Ireland, situated about 17km west of Cookstown.

Features

Ramsar site
The Black Bog Ramsar site (wetlands of international importance designated under the Ramsar Convention), is 183.42 hectares in area. It lies at Latitude 54° 40' 21" N and Longitude 07° 01' 00" W, south of the C612 road (Blackbog Road) in Formil townland. It was designated a Ramsar site on 14 December 1999. It is a large and relatively intact example of a lowland raised bog.

Flora and fauna

The area is thickly covered by various Sphagnum species and exhibits an unusual plant
community including Empetrum nigrum which locally also provides a high cover and Cladonia impexa in large hummocks. No noteworthy fauna has been reported.

See also
List of Ramsar sites in Northern Ireland

References

Bogs of Northern Ireland
Landforms of County Tyrone
Ramsar sites in Northern Ireland